Penistone is a civil parish in the metropolitan borough of Barnsley, South Yorkshire, England.  The parish contains 82 listed buildings that are recorded in the National Heritage List for England.  Of these, one is listed at Grade I, the highest of the three grades, three are at Grade II*, the middle grade, and the others are at Grade II, the lowest grade.  The parish contains the town of Penistone, the villages of Cubley, Hoylandswaine, Millhouse Green, and Thurlstone, and the surrounding countryside.  Most of the listed buildings are houses, cottages and associated structures, farmhouses and farm buildings.  The other listed buildings include churches and a chapel, items in a churchyard, and a former vicarage, a wayside cross, a boundary marker, a guide stoup, milestones, bridges, a railway viaduct, a former cloth hall, a former bank, a former nail workshop, coal drops, a war memorial, and a telephone kiosk.


Key

Buildings

References

Citations

Sources

 

Lists of listed buildings in South Yorkshire
Buildings and structures in the Metropolitan Borough of Barnsley
Listed